Richard Donovan Barry (September 12, 1940 – October 9, 2021) was an American professional baseball player who appeared in 20 games in Major League Baseball for the Philadelphia Phillies in 1969, primarily as an outfielder.

Originally signed by the New York Yankees in 1958 after graduating from Berkeley High School, Barry played 11 full seasons in the minor leagues before reaching the majors in early July 1969. He was a power hitter in the minors, slugging 280 career home runs and topping the 20-HR mark seven different times in his 15-year minor league career. During his midsummer 1969 trial with the Phillies, however, he had only 38 total plate appearances, no runs batted in, and one extra-base hit, a double. He retired after the 1972 season.

Barry died October 9, 2021.

References

External links

Rich Barry at Baseball Almanac

1940 births
2021 deaths
Amarillo Gold Sox players
Augusta Yankees players
Baseball players from Berkeley, California
Binghamton Triplets players
Columbus Confederate Yankees players
Eugene Emeralds players
Greensboro Yankees players
Hawaii Islanders players
Macon Peaches players
Major League Baseball outfielders
Modesto Reds players
Philadelphia Phillies players
Richmond Braves players
Richmond Virginians (minor league) players
San Diego Padres (minor league) players